Krane is a surname of German origin. Notable people with the surname include:

Dammy Krane (born 1992), Nigerian musician
David Krane (born 1972), American businessman
Jonathan D. Krane (1952–2016), American film producer
Kristoff Krane (born 1983), American hip hop artist
Steven C. Krane (1957–2010), American lawyer

See also
Crane (surname)

German-language surnames